Dwight David Eisenhower High School is located  in Yakima, Washington, United States. It is named after U.S. President Dwight D. Eisenhower. It is one of five high schools in the Yakima School District, the others being Davis High School, Stanton Academy, Yakima Online, and Yakima Valley Technical Skills Center (YV-Tech). Students and community members often refer to the school as "Ike."

Principal History
 Ted Murphy (1957-1970) - First Principal of Eisenhower
 Dr Dennis Peterson (1970-1972)
 Mark Bontrager (1972-1973) - Interim Principal, then permanent principal (1973-1978)
 Owen Hurst (1978-1982)
 Bob Alexander (1982-1988)
 Dan Organ (1990-Dec 1992)
 Dave Betzing (Jan-Aug 1993-1994)
 Steven Mitchell (1994-1998)
 Andy Holmlund (1998-2000)
 Robert Ames (2000-2003)
 Stacey Locke (2003-2014) First Female Principal
Clinton Endicott (2014-2015)
 Jewel Brumley (2016-2018)
 Eric Diener (2018–present)

Academics 
Eisenhower High School holds an 82% graduation rate and is ranked 174th among 884 public high schools in the state.

Eisenhower High School is one of five high schools in the Yakima Valley to offer the Advanced Placement Program (AP) for juniors and seniors. Nine percent of the students body is enrolled in AP courses. AP courses that are offered include: Chemistry, U.S. History, English, Calculus, and Physics. The high school maintains a 37% AP Exam pass rate - the percentage of students who pass at least one AP Exam.

Juniors and seniors who do not enroll in AP courses have the opportunity to enroll in other college preparation courses or participate in the running start program at Yakima Valley Community College. The running start program allows high school students to start on college credits while fulfilling high school graduation requirements. Yakima Valley Community College credits are transferable to universities such as the University of Washington, Washington State University, Eastern Washington University, Central Washington University, and many others.

New High School 
In 2013, Eisenhower High School was torn down and replaced with a new building Northwest of the former school. The project cost the Yakima School District over $108 million. The development of the athletic amenities was a large reason to why the district had gone over the initial budget of $108 million. New athletic amenities included on campus baseball fields, tennis courts, soccer practice fields and football practice fields. These amenities added $7.3 million to the total cost of the project.

The new high school was built in a L-shaped configuration with the student commons being located at the corner. This design was incorporated to create loop circulation for the reduction of congestion and giving students alternate pathways to their destinations. By the student commons are the auditorium, foyer, gym, entry spaces, the administrative offices, and security offices. As a focal point, the school's entrance has a prominently positioned glass-enclosed public entry and second-story library. The academic spaces surround the central courtyard on three sides. This design allows natural light to shine into all of the classrooms. The fitness and weight facilities are located on the second floor and overlook the outdoor sports fields. The locker rooms are right underneath. Finally, the auditorium seats 800 people and has practice spaces down the hall. Following these practice space are practice spaces for the band and choir.

Since its unveiling in 2013, the new Eisenhower High School building has won several awards for its concept and design execution. These awards include the following: the AIA Central Washington Merit Award, the Learning by Design Outstanding Project Award, the MIW Excellence in Masonry Design Honor Award, the Inland Northwest AGC Build Northwest Award, and the Robert Faser Masonry Design Award.

KDA Architecture and Graham Construction Lawsuit 
Six years after its opening in August, 2013, the Yakima School District filed a lawsuit against KDA Architecture because of design issues, and property damage of the building's signature blue wall. The lawsuit was about the specific changes that were made from initial design flaws. These changes contributed to the problems found throughout the building. The district also involved Graham Construction in the lawsuit for failing to install and effectively implement all elements of the design. The lawsuit states that in April 2013, the water-resistant material behind the tiles of the blue wall was melting. After further investigation, it was found that the tiles on the blue wall were heating up to 180 degrees Fahrenheit and causing them to melt. The Blue Wall hadn't been repaired until September 2017. The 750 foot wall cost the Yakima School District $547,280.

Additional flaws in the building were spotted by Eisenhower staff and faculty members after they had moved into the building in late August, 2013. After two months inside the new location, there were multiple reports of severe flaws, most notably water had been leaking through the wall and into the school's interior. The lawsuit also states that the leaking and damages were occurring because of the improper design, installation, poor workmanship, and a lack of flashing. In turn, the district had sued for over breach of contract and professional negligence amongst other things.

KDA Architecture and Graham Construction have yet to respond publicly on the lawsuit filed against them. Both have contributed in making repairs to the building and the blue wall, but not free of expenses. Both companies have continued projects in the Yakima Valley, including YV-Technical Institute.

Extracurricular Activities 
Eisenhower High School offers sports for student all throughout the year and provides students the opportunity to compete with other schools in Washington state. Men's sports include: swimming/diving, football, marching band, cross country, basketball, wrestling, baseball, golf, soccer, tennis, and track. Women's sports include: swimming/diving, cross country, marching band, soccer, volleyball, slowpitch, basketball, bowling, fastpitch, golf, tennis, and track.

Outside of sports, the school offers plenty of clubs and activities for students to partake in. Activities for students include: ASB, Anime Club, Art Club, Bridge Club, BSU, Cheer, Color Guard, DECA, Drama, Drill Team, Dance Team, Environmental Club, Fashion Club, FBLA, FCCLA, FFA, Five Star, GSA, Interact, Ike Players Stage Crew, Link Crew, MECHA, Multicultural, Musical, National Honors Society, Orchestra, Robotics, Sasquatch Hiking Club, Sexual Assault Prevention, Skills USA Photography, Speech and Debate (Forensics), Technology Student Association, STEM-TSA, Skills-USA Drafting/Architecture, Skills USA Power Equipment, Skills USA Welding, Vocal Music, and Japanese Exchange.

Diversity 
Minority enrollment at Eisenhower High School is at 73 percent, a majority of which are Hispanic. On average, Washington state high schools have a student body made up of 45 percent minority students. Eisenhower High School is also within the top one percent of student body size within the state of Washington. As of 2020, there are approximately 2,100 students enrolled.

Notable alumni
 Cary Conklin, former NFL quarterback (Washington Redskins, San Francisco 49ers)
 Barry Curtis, original member of The Kingsmen
 Dave Edler, former MLB infielder (Seattle Mariners); former mayor of Yakima (2006–2010)
 Scott Hatteberg, former MLB catcher-first baseman (Boston Red Sox, Oakland Athletics, Cincinnati Reds)
 Leann Hunley, actress (The Misadventures of Sheriff Lobo, Days of Our Lives, Dynasty, Dawson's Creek)
 Paige Mackenzie, LPGA golfer
 Kyle MacLachlan, actor (Dune, Twin Peaks, Sex and the City, Desperate Housewives)
 Mitch Meluskey, former MLB catcher (Houston Astros, Detroit Tigers)
 Kurt Schulz, former NFL defensive back (Buffalo Bills, Detroit Lions)
 Bob Wells, former MLB pitcher (Philadelphia Phillies, Seattle Mariners, Minnesota Twins)
 Christopher Wiehl, actor (Bull, CSI: Crime Scene Investigation, Playmakers, Jericho)

References

External links
 
 

Buildings and structures in Yakima, Washington
High schools in Yakima County, Washington
Public high schools in Washington (state)